CDK may refer to:

 CDK Global, a US-based automotive dealer services company
 The IATA airport code for George T. Lewis Airport, Cedar Key, Florida, United States.
 Chemistry Development Kit, an open source chemical expert system for chemoinformatics and bioinformatics, written in Java
 Chung Do Kwan, founded in 1944, the first of nine schools teaching what came to be known as Taekwondo
 Complete knock down, a production technique, often used in automotive industry
 Curses Development Kit, one of two open source distributions of the Curses widgets library
 Cyclin-dependent kinase, a major class of enzymes involved in the regulation of the cell cycle
 Chronic kidney disease, a progressive loss of function of the kidney.
 Charles De Ketelaere, a Belgian professional footballer.